Benzyl carbamate is the organic compound with the formula C6H5CH2OC(O)NH2. The compound can be viewed as the ester of carbamic acid (O=C(OH)(NH2)) and benzyl alcohol, although it is produced from benzyl chloroformate with ammonia.  It is a white solid that is soluble in organic solvents and moderately soluble in water.  Benzyl carbamate is used as a protected form of ammonia in the synthesis of primary amines.  After N-alkylation, C6H5CH2OC(O) group is removable with Lewis acids.

References

Benzyl compounds
Carbamates
Reagents for organic chemistry